Anonychomyrma gigantea is a species of ant in the genus Anonychomyrma. Described by Smith in 1857, the species is endemic to Malaysia.

References

Anonychomyrma
Hymenoptera of Asia
Insects of Malaysia
Insects described in 1857